High Stakes is a Nancy Drew and Hardy Boys Supermystery crossover novel, published in 1996.

Plot summary
Eileen Reed, a wealthy heiress, lives in Saratoga, New York, enjoying the pride and pleasure of the land with other distinguished residents.  But when her husband-to-be, Jimmy English, is framed for an insignificant crime and disappears, Nancy Drew, who is a guest at the Reed horse farm, tries to solve the case.  Meanwhile, the Hardys have been hired to protect a thoroughbred yearling, Goldenrod, from risks and dangers ahead of a prestigious horse auction. A vicious murder at a society party before the auction seems to connect the two cases. The teams must get their stories straight and join forces, before time runs out.

References

External links
 High Stakes at Fantastic Fiction
Supermystery series books

Supermystery
1996 American novels
1996 children's books
Novels set in New York (state)